This is a list of flag bearers who have represented the Republic of the Congo at the Olympics.

Flag bearers carry the national flag of their country at the opening ceremony of the Olympic Games.

See also
Congo at the Olympics

References

Congo
Olympic flagbearers
Flag bearers
Olympic flagbearers